Dayton Historic District may refer to:
 Dayton Historic District (Dayton, Indiana)
 Dayton Historic District (Dayton, Virginia)
 Downtown Dayton Historic District, a National Register of Historic Places listing in Columbia County, Washington

See also
Dayton-Campbell Historic District, Hamilton, Ohio
Dayton Street Historic District, Cincinnati, Ohio
Dayton Terra-Cotta Historic District, a National Register of Historic Places listing in Dayton, Ohio
Dayton View Historic District, Dayton, Ohio
Daytona Beach Surfside Historic District, Daytona Beach, Florida
East Dayton Street Historic District, a National Register of Historic Places listing in Dane County, Wisconsin